The T. W. Randall House (also known as the Randall-Freeman-Leslie House) is a historic house located at 11685 Northeast SR 314 in Silver Springs, Florida.

Description and history 
It was added to the National Register of Historic Places on April 6, 1995.

References

External links
 Marion County listings at National Register of Historic Places

Houses on the National Register of Historic Places in Florida
National Register of Historic Places in Marion County, Florida
Houses in Marion County, Florida
Folk Victorian architecture in the United States
Houses completed in 1887
Vernacular architecture in Florida